Griffith Morgan House is located in Pennsauken Township, Camden County, New Jersey, United States. The house was built in 1693 and added to the National Register of Historic Places on January 25, 1973.

See also
National Register of Historic Places listings in Camden County, New Jersey
List of the oldest buildings in New Jersey
Joseph Cooper House

References

External links
 Griffith Morgan House - HistoricCamdenCounty.com

Houses completed in 1693
Houses in Camden County, New Jersey
Museums in Camden County, New Jersey
Historic house museums in New Jersey
Pennsauken Township, New Jersey
Houses on the National Register of Historic Places in New Jersey
National Register of Historic Places in Camden County, New Jersey
New Jersey Register of Historic Places
1693 establishments in New Jersey
Stone houses in New Jersey